Ballingarry is a village in County Limerick, Ireland. It lies between Rathkeale and Kilmallock on the R518 road. The population was 521 at the 2016 census. Ballingarry had a vital weaving and linen industry until the Great Famine in 1845.

Canon Edward Joseph Hannan, one of the founders of Scottish football club Hibernian, was born in Ballingarry in 1836. Ballingarry has a long tradition with hurling. The local association football (soccer) team is Ballingarry A.F.C. The local junior soccer team won the Desmond League Premier Division in 2003/2004 and the following year the Granagh-Ballingarry GAA club won the county Intermediate Hurling Championship to achieve Senior status for the first time since 1910.

Notable people

 Anthony Forde, footballer with Oxford United F.C., is from the area.
 Edward Joseph Hannan, priest and founder of Hibernian Football Club, was born and raised in Ballingarry.
 Patrick Walsh, a US Senator for Georgia, was born in Ballingarry in 1840.  Appointed as a Democrat to the United States Senate to fill the vacancy caused by the death of Alfred H. Colquitt; subsequently elected and served from April 1894 to March 1895.

See also
 List of towns and villages in Ireland

References

Towns and villages in County Limerick